Marriageable age (or marriage age) is the general age, as a legal age or as the minimum age subject to parental, religious or other forms of social approval, at which a person is legitimately allowed for marriage.  Age and other prerequisites to marriage vary between jurisdictions, but in the vast majority of jurisdictions, the marriage age as a right is set at the age of majority.  Nevertheless, most jurisdictions allow marriage at a younger age with parental or judicial approval, and some also allow adolescents to marry if the female is pregnant. The age of marriage is most commonly 18 years old, but there are variations, some higher and some lower. The marriageable age should not be confused with the age of majority or the age of consent, though they may be the same in many places.

The 55 parties to the 1962 Convention on Consent to Marriage, Minimum Age for Marriage, and Registration of Marriages have agreed to specify a minimum marriage age by statute law‚ to override customary, religious, and tribal laws and traditions. When the marriageable age under a law of a religious community is lower than that under the law of the land, the state law prevails. However, some religious communities do not accept the supremacy of state law in this respect, which may lead to child marriage or forced marriage. The 123 parties to the 1956 Supplementary Convention on the Abolition of Slavery have agreed to adopt a prescribed "suitable" minimum age for marriage. In many developing countries, the official age prescriptions stand as mere guidelines. UNICEF, the United Nations children's organization, regards a marriage of a minor (legal child), a person below the adult age, as child marriage and a violation of rights.

Until recently, the minimum  marriageable age for females was lower in many jurisdictions than for males, on the premise that females mature at an earlier age than males. This law has been viewed by some to be discriminatory, so that in many countries the marriageable age of females has been raised to equal that of males.

History and social attitudes

Classical antiquity

Greece
Females married as young as 14 or 16. In Spartan marriages, females were around 18 and males were around 25.

In ancient Athens, both husband and wife had the power to initiate a divorce. The husband simply had to send his wife back to her father to end the marriage.

Rome
In the Roman Empire, the Emperor Augustus introduced marriage legislation, the Lex Papia Poppaea, which rewarded marriage and childbearing. The legislation also imposed penalties on young persons who failed to marry and on those who committed adultery. Therefore, marriage and childbearing was made law between the ages of twenty-five and sixty for men, and twenty and fifty for women. Women who were Vestal Virgins were selected between the ages of 6 and 10 to serve as priestesses in the temple of goddess Vesta in the Roman Forum for 30 years, after which time they could marry.

Noblewomen were known to marry as young as 12 years of age, whereas women in the lower social classes were more likely to marry slightly further into their teenage years. The father had the right and duty to seek a good and useful match for his children, and might arrange a child's betrothal long before he or she came of age (age of maturity). To further the interests of their birth families, daughters of the elite would marry into respectable families. If a daughter could prove the proposed husband to be of bad character, she could legitimately refuse the match

In Roman law, age of majority varied from being 25 or as high as 30, though the age of marriage was 12 years for females and 14 years for males, and age of betrothal was 7 years for both males and females. The age of lawful consent to a marriage was 12 for girls and 14 for boys.

Ancient Roman law required brides to be at least 12 years old. In ancient Roman law, first marriages to brides aged 12–25 required the consent of the bride and her father, but by the late antique period Roman law permitted women over 25 to marry without parental consent.

Historically, individuals were allowed to enter into a marriage contract at a very young age. This coincided with signs of puberty: such as the start of menstruation for a female and the growth of pubic hair for a male. In Ancient Rome, the appropriate minimum age was regarded as 14 for males and 12 for females.

43% of Pagan females married as young as 12-15 and 42% of Christian females married as young as 15-18.

In late antiquity, most Roman women married in their late teens to early twenties, but noble women married younger than those of the lower classes, as an aristocratic girl was expected to be virgin until her first marriage. In late antiquity, under Roman law, daughters inherited equally from their parents if no will was produced. In addition, Roman law recognized wives' property as legally separate from husbands' property, as did some legal systems in parts of Europe and colonial Latin America.

In 380 CE, the Emperor Theodosius issued the Edict of Thessalonica, which made Catholicism the official religion of the Roman Empire. The Catholic Church adopted Roman law into Canon law.

Post-classical history
After the fall of the Western Roman Empire and the rise of the Holy Roman Empire, manorialism also helped weaken the ties of kinship and thus the power of clans; as early as the 9th century in northwestern France, families that worked on manors were small, consisting of parents and children and occasionally a grandparent. The Roman Catholic Church and State had become allies in erasing the solidarity and thus the political power of the clans; the Roman Catholic Church sought to replace traditional religion, whose vehicle was the kin group, and substitute the authority of the elders of the kin group with that of a religious elder; at the same time, the king's rule was undermined by revolts by the most powerful kin groups, clans or sections, whose conspiracies and murders threatened the power of the state and also the demands by manorial lords for obedient, compliant workers. As the peasants and serfs lived and worked on farms that they rented from the lord of the manor, they also needed the permission of the lord to marry. Couples therefore had to comply with the lord of the manor and wait until a small farm became available before they could marry and thus produce children; those who could and did delay marriage were presumably rewarded by the landlord and those who did not were presumably denied that reward. For example, marriage ages in Medieval England varied depending on economic circumstances, with couples delaying marriage until their early twenties when times were bad, but might marry in their late teens after the Black Death, when there was a severe labour shortage; by appearances, marriage of adolescents was not the norm in England.

In medieval Western Europe, the rise of Catholicism and manorialism had both created incentives to keep families nuclear, and thus the age of marriage increased; the Western Church instituted marriage laws and practices that undermined large kinship groups. The Roman Catholic Church prohibited consanguineous marriages, a marriage pattern that had been a means to maintain clans (and thus their power) throughout history. The Roman Catholic Church curtailed arranged marriages in which the bride did not clearly agree to the union.

Male and female adolescents needed parental consent to marry because they were under the age of majority, 21 years old. In the 12th century, the Roman Catholic Church drastically changed legal standards for marital consent by allowing daughters over 12 years old and sons over 14 years old to marry without their parents' approval, even if their marriage was made clandestinely.  Parish studies have confirmed that in the late medieval period females did sometimes marry without their parents' approval in England.

In the 12th century, Canon law jurist Gratian, stated that consent for marriage could not take place before the age of 12 years old for females and 14 years old for males; and consent for betrothal could not take place before the age of 7 years old for females and males, as that is the age of reason. The Church of England, after breaking away from the Roman Catholic Church, carried with it the same minimum age requirements. Age of consent for marriage of 12 years old for girls and of 14 years old for boys were written into English civil law.

The first recorded age-of-consent law, in England, dates back 800 years. The age of consent law in question has to do with the law of rape and not the law of marriage as sometimes misunderstood. In 1275, in England, as part of the rape law, the Statute of Westminster 1275, made it a misdemeanor to have sex with a "maiden within age", whether with or without her consent. The phrase "within age" was interpreted by jurist Sir Edward Coke as meaning the age of marriage, which at the time was 12 years old. A 1576 law was created with more severe punishments for having sex with a girl for which the age of consent was set at 10 years old. Under English common law the age of consent apart of the law of rape was 10 or 12 years old and rape was defined as forceful sexual intercourse with a woman against her will. To convict a man of rape, both force and lack of consent had to be proved, except in the case of a girl who is under the age of consent. Since the age of consent applied in all circumstances, not just in physical assaults, the law also made it impossible for an underage girl (under 12 years old) to consent to sexual activity. There was one exception: a man's acts with his wife (females over 12 years old), to which rape law did not apply. Jurist Sir Matthew Hale stated that both rape laws were valid at the same time. In 1875, the Offence Against the Persons Act raised the age to 13 years in England; an act of sexual intercourse with a girl younger than 13 was a felony.

There were some fathers who arranged marriages for a son or a daughter before he or she reached the age of maturity, which is similar to what some fathers in ancient Rome did. Consummation would not take place until the age of maturity. Roman Catholic Canon law defines a marriage as consummated when the "spouses have performed between themselves in a human fashion a conjugal act which is suitable in itself for the procreation of offspring, to which marriage is ordered by its nature and by which the spouses become one flesh." There are recorded marriages of two- and three-year-olds: in 1564, a three-year-old named John was married to a two-year-old named Jane in the Bishop's Court in Chester, England.

Modern history
The policy of the Roman Catholic Church, and later various protestant churches, of considering clandestine marriages and marriages made without parental consent to be valid was controversial, and in the 16th century both the French monarchy and the Lutheran Church sought to end these practices, with limited success.

In most of Northwestern Europe, marriages at very early ages were rare. One thousand marriage certificates from 1619 to 1660 in the Archdiocese of Canterbury show that only one bride was 13 years old, four were 15, twelve were 16, and seventeen were 17 years old; while the other 966 brides were at least 19 years old.

In England and Wales, the Marriage Act 1753 required a marriage to be covered by a licence (requiring parental consent for those under 21) or the publication of banns (which parents of those under 21 could forbid). Additionally, the Church of England dictated that both the bride and groom must be at least 21 years of age to marry without the consent of their families; in the certificates, the most common age for the brides is 22 years. For the grooms 24 years was the most common age, with average ages of 24 years for the brides and 27 for the grooms. While European noblewomen often married early, they were a small minority of the population, and the marriage certificates from Canterbury show that even among nobility it was very rare to marry women off at very early ages.

The minimum age requirements of 12 and 14 were eventually written into English civil law. By default, these provisions became the minimum marriage ages in colonial America. Marriages occurred several years earlier, on average, in colonial America than in Europe, and much higher proportions of the population eventually married. Community-based studies suggest an average age at marriage of about 20 years old for women in the early colonial period and about 26 years old for men. In the late 19th century and throughout the 20th century, U.S. states began to slowly raise the minimum legal age at which individuals were allowed to marry. Age restrictions, as in most developed countries, have been revised upward so that they are now between 15 and 21 years of age.

Before 1929, Scots law followed Roman law in allowing a girl to marry at twelve years of age and a boy at fourteen, without any requirement for parental consent. However, marriage in Scotland at such young ages was in practice almost unknown.

France
In France, until the French Revolution, the marriageable age was 12 years for females and 14 for males. Revolutionary legislation in 1792 increased the age to 13 years for females and 15 for males. Under the Napoleonic Code in 1804, the marriageable age was set at 15 years old for females and 18 years old for males. In 2006, the marriageable age for females was increased to 18, the same as for males. In jurisdictions where the ages are not the same, the marriageable age for females is more commonly two or three years lower than that for males.

Central Europe
In 17th century Poland, in the Warsaw parish of St John, the average age of women entering marriage was 20.1, and of men, 23.7. In the second half of the eighteenth century, women in the parish of Holy Cross married at 21.8, while men at 29.

Eastern Europe
In medieval Eastern Europe, the Slavic traditions of patrilocality of early and universal marriage (usually of a bride aged 13–15 years, with menarche occurring on average at 14) lingered; the manorial system had yet to penetrate into Eastern Europe and had generally had less effect on clan systems there; and the bans on cross-cousin marriages had not been firmly enforced.

In Russia, before 1830 the age of consent for marriage was 15 years old for males and 13 years old for females (though 15 years old was preferred for females, so much so that it was written into the Law Code of 1649). Teenage marriage was practiced for chastity. Both the female and the male teenager needed consent of their parents to marry because they were under 20 years old, the age of majority. In 1830, the age of consent for marriage was raised to 18 years old for males and 16 years old for females (though 18 years old was preferred for females). The average age of marriage for females was around 19 years old.

Mesoamerica

Aztec society
Aztec family law generally followed customary law. Men got married between the ages of 20-22, and women generally got married at 15 to 18 years of age.

Mayan civilization
Maya family law appears to have been based on customary law. Maya men and women usually got married at around the age of 20, though women sometimes got married at the age of 16 or 17.

Marriageable age as a right vs exceptions
In the majority of countries, a right to marry at age 18 is enshrined along with all other rights and responsibilities of adulthood. However, most of these countries allow those younger than that age to marry, usually with parental consent or judicial authorization. These exceptions vary considerably by country. The United Nations Population Fund stated:

In recent years, many countries in the EU have tightened their marriage laws, either banning marriage under 18 completely, or requiring judicial approval for such marriages. Countries which have reformed their marriage laws in recent years include Sweden (2014), Denmark (2017), Germany (2017), Luxembourg (2014), Spain (2015), Netherlands (2015), Finland (2019) and Ireland (2019). Many developing countries have also enacted similar laws in recent years: Honduras (2017), Ecuador (2015), Costa Rica (2017), Panama (2015), Trinidad & Tobago (2017), Malawi (2017).

The minimum age requirements of 12 years old for females and 14 years old for males were written into English civil law. By default, these provisions became the minimum marriage ages in colonial America. This English common law inherited from the British remained in force in America unless a specific state law was enacted to replace them. In the United States, as in most developed countries, age restrictions have been revised upward so that they are now between 15 and 21 years of age.

In Western countries, marriages of teenagers have become rare in recent years, with their frequency declining during the past few decades. For instance, in Finland, where in the early 21st century underage youth could obtain a special judicial authorization to marry, there were only 30–40 such marriages per year during that period (with most of the spouses being aged 17), while in the early 1990s, more than 100 such marriages were registered each year. Since 1 June 2019 Finland has banned marriages of anyone under 18 with no exemptions.

Relation to the age of majority

The marriage age as a right is usually the same with the age of majority which is 18 years old in most countries. However, in some countries, the age of majority is under 18, while in others it is 19, 20 or 21. In Canada for example, the age of majority is 19 in Nova Scotia, New Brunswick, British Columbia,
Newfoundland and Labrador, Northwest Territories, Yukon and  Nunavut, and marriage under 19 in these provinces requires parental or court consent (see Marriage in Canada). In USA for example, the age of majority is 21 in Mississippi and 19 in Nebraska and requires parental consent. In many jurisdictions of North America, by marriage minors become legally emancipated.

By country

Africa

Americas

Asia

Europe
The marriageable age as a right is 18 in all European countries, with the exception of Andorra and Scotland where it is 16 (for both sexes). Existing exceptions to this general rule (usually requiring special judicial or parental consent) are discussed below. In both the European Union and the Council of Europe the marriageable age falls within the jurisdiction of individual member states. The Istanbul convention, the first legally binding instrument in Europe in the field of violence against women and domestic violence, only requires countries which ratify it to prohibit forced marriage (Article 37) and to ensure that forced marriages can be easily voided without further victimization (Article 32), but does not make any reference to a minimum age of marriage.

Oceania

By religion

Judaism

Classical Antiquity
In ancient Israel, men twenty years old and older would become warriors and when they would get married, they would get one year leave of absence to be with their wife.

Before the end of Second Temple Judaism, Rabbis set the age of marriage for every Israelite at 18 years old. Women were expected to marry by 20 years old and men were expected to marry by 24 years old.

In late antiquity, males and females were expected to be married by 20 years old in teenage marriage. Rabbis estimated the age of maturity from about the beginning of the thirteenth year with women and about the beginning of the fourteenth year with men.

On the practice of Levirate marriage, the Talmud advised against a large age gap between a man and his brother's widow. A younger woman marrying a significantly older man, however, is especially problematic: marrying one's young daughter to an old man was declared, by the Sanhedrin, as reprehensible as forcing her into prostitution.

Post-Classical period

In Rabbinic Judaism, males cannot consent to marriage until they reach the age of 13 years and a day and have undergone puberty and females cannot consent to marriage until they reach the age of 12 years and a day and have undergone puberty. Males and females are considered minors until the age of twenty. After twenty, males are not considered adults if they show signs of impotence. If males show no signs of puberty or do show impotence, they automatically become adults by age 35 and can marry.

Marriage involved a double ceremony, which included the formal betrothal and wedding rites.

The minimum age for marriage was 13 years old for males and 12 years old for females but formal betrothal could take place before that and often did. Talmud advises males to get married at 18 years old or between 16 years old and 24 years old.

A ketannah (literally meaning "little [one]") was any girl between the age of 3 years and that of 12 years plus one day; she was subject to her father's authority, and he could arrange a marriage for her without her agreement, and that marriage remains binding even after reaching the age of maturity. If a girl was orphaned from her father, or she was married by his authority and subsequently divorced, she, her mother, or her brother could marry her in a quasi-binding fashion. Until the age of maturity, she could annul the marriage retroactively. After reaching the age of maturity, intercourse with her husband renders her officially married.

Modern period
Jewish people follow the law of the land that they live in. In modern Israel, the general age for marriage is 18 years old for males and females but with judicial consent 16 year old males and females can marry.

Christianity
Catholic canon law adopted Roman law, which set the minimum age of marriage at 12 years old for females and 14 years old for males. The Roman Catholic Church raised the minimum age of marriage to 14 years old for females and to 16 years old for males in 1917 and lowered the age of majority to 18 years old in 1983.

Higher ages set by Conferences of Bishops

Islam

Golden Age

Sunni and Shia
Hanafi and Ja'fari schools of classical Islamic jurisprudence interpret the "age of marriage", in the Quran (24:59;65:4), as the beginning of puberty; that is 9–11 years old.

'Büchler and Schlater mention that the schools of Islamic jurisprudence (madhaahib) set the following marriageable ages for boys and girls:

Marriages were traditionally contracted by the father or guardian of the bride and her intended husband.

Sunni
Shafiʽi, Hanbali, and Maliki schools of classical Islamic jurisprudence interpret the "age of marriage", in the Quran (24:59), as completion of puberty; that is 15-17. For Shafiʽi, Hanbali, and Maliki schools of Islamic jurisprudence, in Sunni Islam, the condition for marriage is physical (bulugh) maturity and mental (rushd) maturity.

Büchler and Schlater mention that the schools of Islamic jurisprudence (madhaahib) set the following marriageable ages for boys and girls:

Büchler and Schlater state that "marriageable age according to classical Islamic law coincides with the occurrence of puberty. The notion of puberty refers to signs of physical maturity such as the emission of semen or the onset of menstruation".

In his Shafiʽi jurisprudential compilation The Stocks of the Sojourner, Ahmad Ibn Naqib Al-Misri (died 1368 A.D.) writes:

Modern period
Marriages are traditionally contracted by the father or guardian of the bride and her intended husband.

The 1917 codification of Islamic family law in the Ottoman empire distinguished between the age of competence for marriage, which was set at 18 for boys and 17 for girls, and the minimum age for marriage, which followed the traditional Hanafi minimum ages  of 12 for boys and 9 for girls. Marriage below the age of competence was permissible only if proof of sexual maturity was accepted in court, while marriage under the minimum age was forbidden.

During the 20th century,  most countries in the Middle East followed the Ottoman precedent in defining the age of competence, while raising the minimum age to 15 or 16 for boys and 15–16 for girls. Marriage below the age of competence is subject to approval by a judge and the legal guardian of the child. Egypt diverged from this pattern by setting the age limits of 18 for boys and 16 for girls, without a distinction between competence for marriage and minimum age.

Many senior clerics in Saudi Arabia have opposed setting a minimum age for marriage, arguing that a girl reaches adulthood at puberty.

However in 2019  Members of the Saudi Shoura Council in 2019 approved fresh regulations for child marriage that will see to outlaw marrying off 15-year-old children and force the need for court approval for those under 18. Chairman of the Human Rights Committee at the Shoura Council, Dr. Hadi Al-Yami, said that introduced controls were based on in-depth studies presented to the body. He pointed out that the regulation, vetted by the Islamic Affairs Committee at the Shoura Council, has raised the age of marriage to 18 and prohibited it for those under 15.

Hinduism
The Dharmaśāstras state that females can marry only after they have reached puberty. However, there is no fixed age in Hinduism as the religion is not under any single institution. However, the Hindu Code Law which includes Hindus, Jains, Sikhs and Buddhists has fixed the legal age of marriage - 21 years for men and 18 years for women in India.

Baha'i Faith

In the Kitáb-i-Aqdas, the age of marriage is set at 15 for both boys and girls. It is forbidden to become engaged before the age of 15.

See also 
 List of countries by age at first marriage
 Age disparity in sexual relationships
 Arranged marriage
 Child marriage
 Convention on Consent to Marriage, Minimum Age for Marriage and Registration of Marriages (UN treaty)
 Legality of polygamy
 Mature minor doctrine
 Polygamy
 Teenage marriage

References

External links 
 Age at 1st marriage in Gapminder World
 Cornell Law table of marriage age by state and territory for the United States

Law-related lists
Marriage age
Minimum ages
Sex laws
Statutory law